My Wife's Family is a 1941 British domestic comedy film directed by Walter C. Mycroft and starring Charles Clapham, John Warwick, David Tomlinson and Patricia Roc.

The film is notable as one of five film versions based on the popular stage farce of the same name by Fred Duprez. There was a previous British version in 1931; a Swedish version Mother-in-Law's Coming, in 1932; a 1933 Finnish film Voi meitä! Anoppi tulee; and a British remake in 1956.

Plot 
A farce concerning the attempts of a naval officer to avoid a visit from his wife's overbearing mother-in-law, and cope with a former girlfriend at the same time.

Cast
Doc Knott -	Charles Clapham
Jack Gay -	John Warwick
Peggy, his Wife -	Patricia Roc
Noah Bagshott -	Wylie Watson
Sally the Maid -	Peggy Bryan
Rosa Latour -	Chili Bouchier
Mrs Bagshott -	Margaret Scudamore
Policeman -	Leslie Fuller
Second Maid -	Davina Craig
Irma -	Joan Greenwood
Willie -	David Tomlinson

Critical reception 
TV Guide wrote, "every old joke you never wanted to hear repeated is packed into this dusty, but still mildly amusing comedy." Allmovie gave the film two out of five stars, and referred to the film as an "old-joke-filled farce."

References

External links 
 

1941 films
1941 comedy films
British comedy films
British black-and-white films
British films based on plays
Remakes of British films
1940s English-language films
1940s British films
English-language comedy films